This is a List of political parties in Southern Europe, linking to the country list of parties and the political system of each country in the region.

List of countries

See also
List of political parties by region

Southern Europe